The cream-backed woodpecker (Campephilus leucopogon) is a species of bird in subfamily Picinae of the woodpecker family Picidae. It is found in Argentina, Bolivia, Brazil, Paraguay and Uruguay.

Taxonomy and systematics

The cream-backed woodpecker was for a time placed in genus Scapaneus that was later merged into genus Phloeoceastes that was itself merged into the current genus Campephilus. The cream-backed woodpecker is monotypic.

Description

Adult males have a crest; their head, crest, and neck are entirely red but for a small black and white spot on the ear coverts. Adult females have a longer crest than males and do not have the covert spot. They have a creamy band from the bill to the ear coverts with black above it that surrounds the eye and extends along the front of the crest, and also a thinner black line below the creamy band. The rest of their head is red and their neck is black. Adults of both sexes are mostly black below the neck. They have a whitish upper back with pale cinnamon-buff feather tips and sometimes a few buff and black barred feathers in the center of the back. Their flight feathers have much pale cinnamon on the bases of their inner webs. Their bill is a long ivory chisel, their iris pale yellow, and their legs gray. Juveniles resemble adults but with less red that is more orange. Males resemble adult females with a red crown and crest and females have less red on their head than adults.

Distribution and habitat

The cream-backed woodpecker is found from north-central Bolivia and western and central Paraguay east and south to north central Argentina, northern Uruguay, and southeastern Brazil's Rio Grande do Sul. It inhabits the generally open landscapes of the dry Gran Chaco including savanna, woodlands, transitional forest, pastures with copses of trees, and palm groves.

Behavior

Movement

The cream-backed woodpecker is a year-round resident throughout its range.

Feeding

The cream-backed woodpecker's primary food is beetle larvae. It mostly forages in tall trees, often those isolated in otherwise open areas, but will feed on fallen logs. It exposes its prey by hammering and less frequently by pecking and probing. It mostly forages alone except in the breeding season.

Breeding

The cream-backed woodpecker's breeding season begins in September but is concentrated in October and November. Both parents feed nestlings, but other details of parental care, the clutch size, incubation period, and time to fledging are not known.

Vocal and non-vocal sounds

The cream-backed woodpecker's call is "pi-ow" or "kwee-yaw" that is sometimes repeated. Partners exchange "whirring notes". It also communicates with a quiet "ahem" and various soft and squeaky chattering calls. Its drum is a double tap.

Status

The IUCN has assessed cream-backed woodpecker as being of Least Concern. it has a large range, and though its population size is not known it is believed to be stable. No immediate threats have been identified. It is poorly known and probably not common.

References

Further reading

cream-backed woodpecker
Birds of Argentina
Birds of Bolivia
Birds of the Gran Chaco
Birds of Paraguay
cream-backed woodpecker
Taxonomy articles created by Polbot